Velichkovo may refer to the following places:

Bulgaria
Velichkovo, Pazardzhik Province, village in Pazardzhik Municipality
Velichkovo, Varna Province, village in Dalgopol Municipality